Gilino  is a village in the administrative district of Gmina Bielsk, within Płock County, Masovian Voivodeship, in east-central Poland.

The village has a population of 360.

External links
 Jewish Community in Gilino on Virtual Shtetl

References

Gilino